KM Asif (born 24 July 1993) is an Indian cricketer who represents Kerala in domestic cricket and Chennai Super Kings in Indian Premier League (IPL). He is a right-handed batsman and right-arm fast-medium pacer.

Early life
Asif's father was a daily wager while his mother was a homemaker. His younger brother is intellectually disabled and his younger sister has challenges after suffering a brain injury during her formative years. He has been mentored by Biju George.

In 2016, he worked in Dubai as a storekeeper. But he soon returned home to attend a fast-bowling trial conducted across India. He also attended open trials for the UAE national team at the ICC Academy but was rejected and soon returned to India.

Domestic career

Asif hasn't played any form of age-group cricket for Kerala. He made his Twenty20 debut for Kerala in the 2017–18 Zonal T20 League on 12 January 2018. He was the joint-highest wicket-taker for Kerala in the tournament with 5 wickets from two matches. He made his List A debut for Kerala in the 2017–18 Vijay Hazare Trophy on 9 February 2018.

In August 2018, he was one of five players that were suspended for three games in the 2018–19 Vijay Hazare Trophy, after showing dissent against Kerala's captain, Sachin Baby.

He finished as Kerala's joint-highest wicket-taker in the 2019-20 Vijay Hazare Trophy with 14 wickets from seven matches. He made his first-class debut for Kerala on 9 December 2019 in the 2019–20 Ranji Trophy.

Indian Premier League
In January 2018, he was bought by the Chennai Super Kings in the 2018 IPL auction. He made his IPL debut that season against Delhi Daredevils after an injury to Deepak Chahar. In February 2022, he was again bought by the Chennai Super Kings in the auction for the 2022 Indian Premier League tournament. In the 2023 auction, he was bought by Rajasthan Royals for INR 30 lakh.

References

External links
 

1993 births
Living people
Indian cricketers
Kerala cricketers
Chennai Super Kings cricketers
People from Malappuram district